Story of Pao or Pao's Story is a 2006 Vietnamese film.

It stars Đỗ Thị Hải Yến who also starred in The Quiet American, and was directed and written by her husband Ngô Quang Hải. It is set among the Hmong people of North Vietnam, and won four Golden Kite Prizes (the Oscars of Vietnam).

References

External links
Official site (Vietnamese) 

Hmong culture
2006 in Vietnam
2006 drama films
2006 films
Vietnamese drama films